Bernd Truschinski (13 April 1949 – 25 January 2008) was a German rower. He competed at the 1972 Summer Olympics and the 1976 Summer Olympics.

References

External links
 

1949 births
2008 deaths
German male rowers
Olympic rowers of West Germany
Rowers at the 1972 Summer Olympics
Rowers at the 1976 Summer Olympics
Sportspeople from Dortmund
World Rowing Championships medalists for Germany